Su'ao Cold Spring is a cold spring in Su'ao Township, Yilan County, Taiwan.

History
The cold spring was discovered by the Japanese army in 1928.

Geology
Su'ao Cold Spring has a spring water temperature of 22 °C. It is both batheable and drinkable, and it has a pH of 5.5. According to Japanese researchers, the cold spring contains carbonic ion concentrations of 68ppm, the highest of all springs in Taiwan. Its sodium ion concentrations were 14.3ppm and calcium ion 10.7ppm. Su'ao Cold Spring is the only calcium hydroxy carbonic spring in Taiwan.

Su'ao Cold Spring contains a generous volume of carbon dioxide, which was in the past used to produce Ramune (Natural soda water).

Transportation
 Train: TRA Yilan line to Su'ao Station is approximately 300m.
 Highway: Tai 2 from Taipei, Tai 9 both south from Hualien City, north from Taipei.
 Freeway: Freeway number 5

See also
 List of tourist attractions in Taiwan
 Taiwanese hot springs

References

1928 establishments in Taiwan
Springs of Taiwan
Landforms of Yilan County, Taiwan
Tourist attractions in Yilan County, Taiwan